The Wetzlarer Kreuz is an Autobahn interchange in the city of Wetzlar in Hesse, Germany where the highways A45 and A480 meet.
This junction is a stack interchange, which is the only fully built stack interchange in Germany.

Manual traffic count near the interchange 
The interchange is traveled daily by about 61,000 vehicles.

References 

Buildings and structures in Wetzlar
Wetzlarer